Teen Maar is a 2011 Indian Telugu-language romantic drama film directed by Jayanth C. Paranjee from a screenplay written by Trivikram Srinivas. A remake of 2009 Hindi film Love Aaj Kal, it stars Pawan Kalyan, Trisha, and Kriti Kharbanda. The film's music is composed by Mani Sharma. The film portrays the feeling of pure love which never changes, although the perspective of realising one's soulmate has changed over time. The film was released on 14 April 2011.

Plot
Michael Velayudham (Pawan Kalyan) is a chef in Italy. He is an easygoing chap who flirts with girls and makes the most of his affairs. His ambition is to go to the US and work in New York for a stockbroker. He dates one of his acquaintances, Meera Shastri (Trisha), an art restoration professional in Cape Town. After a year, they agree to break up as she has to move to India for work and he thinks long-distance relationships do not work. In Cape Town, Michael meets Senapathi (Paresh Rawal), the owner of a restaurant who narrates the love story of his friend Arjun Palwai (Pawan Kalyan) with Vasumati (Kriti Kharbanda), which had happened around 1981. Meanwhile, after Meera moves to India, Michael fails to connect with any other girl. To prove to her that he has moved on, he meets a blonde girl named Michelle (Danah Marks) in a bar and dates her. However, Meera is proposed to by her family friend, politician Sudheer (Sonu Sood), and she agrees to marry him, only to prove that she has moved on too. He comes to India with some pretext and meets Meera. Michael, who is frustrated that Meera married Sudheer, gets desperate and tries to regret what had happened so far. In his sorrow, he gets an offer for his dream job in the US. After initially having joyful moments in his new job, he eventually feels some loneliness, which he does not understand. The rest of the story focuses on how Michael realizes his mistakes and how Arjun's story makes an impact on his decision.

Cast

 Pawan Kalyan in a dual role as Michael Velayudham and Arjun Palwai
 Trisha as Meera Shastri 
 Kriti Kharbanda as Vasumathi
 Danah Marks as Michelle
 Paresh Rawal as Seenapthi
 Sonu Sood as Sudhir
 Ali as Taxi Driver 
 Tanikella Bharani as Michael's father
 Sudha as Michael's mother
 Mukesh Rishi as Vasumathi's father 
 Pragathi  as Vasumathi's mother
 Shankar Melkote as Restaurant owner
 Rajitha

Production
B. Ganesh and Pawan Kalyan bought the rights to remake the Bollywood film Love Aaj Kal . The film, which was earlier referred to as Khushiga and Lovely, before being officially titled as Teen Maar. The film began its production in September 2010.

Soundtrack
Mani Sharma composed the songs for the film and compiled the background score. The audio of the film was released on 21 March 2011. The Audio was Released on Aditya Music.

Reception
Indiaglitz stated that "Pawan Kalyan surely focused on this movie and consciously worked hard not to disappoint his fans. He succeeds in his attempt. It is a good movie that makes for a pleasant watch". Oneindia stated that "The film is about a clash between the current and the past generation. The audience in B, C centres may find it difficult to understand the movie at parts due to the jumbling of scenes, which highlight the present and past generation. Moreover, the use of Italian language by the hero for most part of the first half may confuse the audience. However, the film would run well in A centres and it is worth a watch".

References

External links
 

2011 films
2010s Telugu-language films
Telugu remakes of Hindi films
Films scored by Mani Sharma
Films set in Cape Town
Films shot in South Africa
Indian romantic drama films
Films directed by Jayanth C. Paranjee
2011 romantic drama films